Scheherazade is a major character, and the storyteller, of the Middle Eastern collection of tales known as One Thousand and One Nights.

Scheherazade (including variant spellings) also may refer to:

Astronomy 
 Shahrazad (crater), crater on the moon Enceladus
 643 Scheherezade,  asteroid

Art

Film and TV  
 The Magic of Scheherazade, 1987 video game created by Culture Brain
 "Scheherezade", episode of Law & Order: Special Victims Unit
 Shahrzad (TV series), Iranian television drama series
 Shéhérazade (film),  1963 French film starring Anna Karina
 Scheherazade (film), 2018 French film directed by Jean-Bernard Marlin
 Şehrazat (film), 1964 Turkish thriller
 Song of Scheherazade,  1947 American film starring Yvonne De Carlo and Jean-Pierre Aumont

Literature
A sister to Scheherazade, 1987 novel by Assia Djebar

Music 
 Scheherazade and Other Stories, 1975 album by the English band Renaissance
 Scheherazade, a 2016 album by American band Freakwater
 Scheherazade (Rimsky-Korsakov), a symphonic suite later used for a ballet by Michel Fokine
 Scheherazade,  1848 classical composition work of Robert Schumann as part of his Album for the Young
 Shéhérazade (Ravel), either of two works by Ravel
 Sheherazade,  masque for piano by Karol Szymanowski

People with the given name 
 Shahrzad (Reza Kamal) (1898–1937), Iranian dramatist and playwright
 Şehrazat or Scheherazade (born 1952), Turkish singer-songwriter
 Sheherazade Goldsmith (born 1974), actress, writer and ecological campaigner
 Shahrzad Sepanlou (born 1975), Iranian-American singer
 Shérazad Reix (born 1989), French professional tennis player

Other 
 Scheherazade New,  Naskh-style Arabic script font
 Scheherazade (yacht), a superyacht